Werner Radspieler (13 August 1938 – 7 March 2018) was a Roman Catholic bishop.

Radspieler was ordained to the priesthood in 1964. He served as titular bishop of 'Thugga' and as auxiliary bishop of the Roman Catholic Archdiocese of Bamberg from 1986 until 2013.

Notes

1938 births
2018 deaths
20th-century German Roman Catholic bishops
21st-century German Roman Catholic bishops
20th-century German Roman Catholic priests
Clergy from Nuremberg